Rajendra Singh (born 1959) is a water conservationist.

Rajendra Singh is also the name of:
 Rajendra Singh (brigadier) (1899–1947), officer in the Indian Army
 Rajendra Singh (RSS) (1921–2003), fourth sarsanghchalak of the RSS
 Rajendra Singh (politician) (born 1951), member of Uttarakhand Legislative Assembly
 Rajendra Singh (coast guard) (born 1959), former Director general of the Indian Coast Guard
 Rajendra Singh Babu (born 1952), Kannada film maker and producer
 Rajendra Singh Lodha (?–2008), Indian chartered accountant
 Rajendra Singh Paroda (born 1942), Indian agricultural scientist
 Rajendra Kumar Singh, Indian politician from Madhya Pradesh
 Rajendra Pratap Singh (born 1954), Indian politician from Uttar Pradesh

See also